Scotogramma deffessa is a species of cutworm or dart moth in the family Noctuidae.

The MONA or Hodges number for Scotogramma deffessa is 10251.

References

Further reading

 
 
 

Hadenini
Articles created by Qbugbot
Moths described in 1880